InFocus M810 is a smartphone marketed by InFocus and manufactured by Foxconn. It was released on July 31, 2014.

Specifications 

 Display: 5.50-inch FULL HD IPS Display
 Processor: Snapdragon 801 @ 2.50GHz (Krait-Quad Cores)
 Rear Camera: 13-megapixel
 Front Camera: 5-megapixel
 RAM: 2GB
 OS: Android 4.4.2 / Android 5.0.1
 Storage: 16GB(Upgradable to 64GB)
 Battery capacity: 2600mAh

Criticism
The Infocus M810 was marketed as a 4g capable device in India. However, it does not support the 2300 MHz bandwidth which is commonly used as the standard in India.

See also
InFocus Epic 1

References

External links 

 

Mobile phones introduced in 2014
Android (operating system) devices
Smartphones